The Toyota AD engine family is a series of 16 valve DOHC inline-4 turbo diesel engines with electronic common rail direct injection using an aluminium cylinder head and an aluminium cylinder block with cast iron liners derived from the petrol Toyota AZ engine. The AD engine is offered in 2.0 and 2.2 liter versions. These engines are produced mainly for Europe, but few are exported to other areas such as India or New Zealand.



1AD-FTV
Technical specifications:

 Fuel injection system: common rail  9 hole solenoid injectors with pilot injection;
 Camshaft drive:Timing Chain
 Exhaust gas treatment: EGR, equipped with cooler and oxidation catalyst;
 Emission standard: Euro IV 
 Compression Ratio:16.8:1
 Fuel consumption combined: 
  emission combined: /km

Applications:

Intercooled VGT

Applications:

 at 3600 rpm,  at 2000-3200 rpm (Europe, DIN)
2006–2008 Second Generation Toyota Avensis 2.0 D4-D
2007–2009 Second Generation Toyota Auris 2.0 D4-D
2006–2009 Third Generation Toyota Corolla Verso 2.0 D4-D
The AD series engines would get refreshed to meet Euro V emissions with an upgraded fuel injection system, lower compression and addition of a DPF system collectively called by Toyota as Toyota Optimal Drive .

Technical specifications:

 Fuel injection system: common rail  10 hole piezoelectric injectors with 5-stage pilot injection;
 Camshaft drive:Timing Chain
 Exhaust gas treatment: EGR, equipped with cooler and oxidation catalyst; DPF on some models
 Emission standard: Euro IV or Euro V with DPF 
 Compression Ratio:15.8:1
 Fuel consumption combined: 
  emission combined: /km

Applications:

Intercooled VGT

 at 3600 rpm,  at 1800-2400 rpm (Europe, DIN)

2008–08.2010 Third Generation Toyota Avensis 2.0 D4-D
2009-2010 First Generation Toyota Verso 2.0 D4-D
Intercooled VGT with DPF

 at 3600 rpm,  at 1800-2400 rpm (Europe, DIN)

2009–2013 Second Generation Toyota Auris 2.0 D4-D
08.2010–2015 Third Generation Toyota Avensis 2.0 D4-D
08.2010-2013 First Generation Toyota Verso 2.0 D4-D
 at 3600 rpm,  at 1600-2400 rpm (Europe, DIN)

 2013–2015 Fourth Generation Toyota RAV4 2.0 D4-D

2AD-FTV
Technical specifications:

 Fuel injection system: common rail  9 hole solenoid injectors with pilot injection;
 Camshaft drive:Timing Chain
 Exhaust gas treatment: EGR, equipped with cooler and oxidation catalyst;
 Emission standard: Euro IV 
 Compression Ratio:16.8:1
 Fuel consumption combined: 
  emission combined: /km

Applications:

Intercooled VGT

 at 3600 rpm,  at 2000-3200 rpm (Europe, DIN)

 2007–2009 Third Generation Toyota RAV4 2.2 D4-D 
 2006–2008 Second Generation Toyota Avensis 2.2 D4-D 
2005–2009 Third Generation Toyota Corolla Verso MC2 D4-D 

The AD series engines would get refreshed to meet Euro V emissions with an upgraded fuel injection system, lower compression and addition of a DPF system collectively called by Toyota as Toyota Optimal Drive .

Technical specifications:

 Fuel injection system: common rail  10 hole piezoelectric injectors with 5-stage pilot injection;
 Camshaft drive:Timing Chain
 Exhaust gas treatment: EGR, equipped with cooler and oxidation catalyst;
 Emission standard: Euro V 
 Compression Ratio:15.7:1
 Fuel consumption combined: 
  emission combined: /km

Applications:

Intercooled VGT

 at 3600 rpm,  at 2000-2800 rpm (Europe, DIN)

 2009–2013 Third Generation Toyota RAV4 2.2 D4-D 
 2008–2015 Third Generation Toyota Avensis 2.2 
 2010–2013 First Generation Lexus IS200d
2013–2015(EU), 2019(AU/RU) Fourth Generation Toyota RAV4 2.2 D4-D (MT models)

2AD-FHV
Technical specifications:

 Fuel injection system: common rail ,10 hole piezoelectric injectors with 5-stage pilot injection;
 Camshaft drive: Timing Chain
 Exhaust gas treatment: EGR, equipped with cooler and 4-way DPNR Catalyst and Exhaust Port Injection 
 Emission standard: Euro IV 
 Compression Ratio:15.8:1
 Fuel consumption combined: 
  emission combined: /km

Applications:

Intercooled e-VGT

 at 4000 rpm,  at 2000-2600 rpm (Europe, DIN)

 2006–2010 First Generation Lexus IS 220d
2005–2009 Second  Generation Toyota Avensis 2.2 (D-4D)
2006–2009 Third Generation Toyota RAV4 D-CAT 
2007–2009 Second  Generation Toyota Auris 2.2 D-CAT 
2005–2009 Third Generation Toyota Corolla Verso MC2 D4D 

The AD series engines would get refreshed to meet Euro V emissions with an upgraded fuel injection system, lower compression and addition of a DPF system collectively called by Toyota as Toyota Optimal Drive .

Technical specifications:

 Fuel injection system: common rail ,10 hole piezoelectric injectors with 5-stage pilot injection;
 Camshaft drive: Timing Chain
 Exhaust gas treatment: EGR, equipped with cooler and 4-way DPNR Catalyst and Exhaust Port Injection 
 Emission standard: Euro V 
 Compression Ratio:15.7:1 
 Fuel consumption combined: 
  emission combined: /km

Applications:

Intercooled e-VGT

 at 4000 rpm,  at 2000-2800 rpm (Europe, DIN)

 2008–2011 Third Generation Toyota Avensis 2.2 
 2009–2011 Second  Generation Toyota Auris 2.2 D-CAT

 at 3600 rpm,  at 2000-2800 rpm (Europe, DIN)

 2008–2015 Third Generation Toyota Avensis 2.2 
 2009–2013 Third Generation Toyota RAV4 D-CAT 
 2009-2012 First Generation Toyota Verso 2.0 D4-D
 2013–2015 (EU), 2019 (AU/RU) Fourth Generation Toyota RAV4 2.2 D-CAT (AT models)

References

External links

AD engine
Diesel engines by model
Straight-four engines